"Welcome to St. Tropez" is a song by Swiss DJ and record producer DJ Antoine taken from his studio album 2011. It features vocals by Russian rapper Timati and American singer-songwriter Kalenna. Originally, the song is by Timati and Russian singer Blue Marine. The song became a top-ten hit in Austria, France, Germany, the Netherlands, Poland, Romania and Switzerland.

Music video 
There are two versions of the music video. Kalenna does not appear in either versions. In the first version DJ Antoine is on stage wearing a red suit and throwing different colored pairs of sunglasses into the audience, while clapping and waving around his hands in St. Tropez, singing at some clubs and doing several activities such as riding a horse bareback. There are several scenes showing people laughing. The second version features additional scenes with DJ Antoine driving a Ferrari dressed in a clown costume.

Chart performance

Weekly charts

DJ Antoine version

Year-end charts

Certifications

See also
2011 in music
List of top 100 singles of 2011 (France)
List of Romanian Top 100 number ones of the 2010s

References

External links
 
 

2011 songs
Songs written by Kalenna Harper
Number-one singles in Romania
Saint-Tropez in fiction
Songs about cities
Songs about France